Ławki  is a village in the administrative district of Gmina Wilczęta, within Braniewo County, Warmian-Masurian Voivodeship, in northern Poland.

The village has a population of 217.

References

External links 
 Lauck manor house in the 19th century 

Villages in Braniewo County